Rotnes is the administrative centre of Nittedal municipality, Norway. Its population (2010) is  20 939. It is located by the Norwegian National Road 4.

References

Villages in Akershus